The Blohm & Voss P 211 was a design proposal submitted by Blohm & Voss to the Volksjäger jet fighter competition of the Luftwaffe Emergency Fighter Program towards the end of the Second World War.

History
During the latter part of 1944, when the High Command of the Luftwaffe saw that there was a dire need to put up a strong defense against the devastating allied bombing raids, on September 8 they asked aircraft manufacturers Messerschmitt, Arado, Focke-Wulf, Heinkel, Junkers and Blohm & Voss to propose designs for single-engined light fighters weighing no more than 2000 kg that would use one BMW 003 jet engine per unit.

Owing to the war-related scarcity of strategic materials such as aluminum, the jets were required to be simplified in order to be built using a strict minimum, as well as to be built in adequate quantities as quickly as possible in underground factories. Despite these requirements that would impinge on the overall quality of the new planes, their performance was required to surpass that of the best piston-engined fighters, being able to reach a maximum speed of 750 km/h with a minimum combat action time of 30 minutes.

Blohm & Voss submitted two preliminary designs, the P 210 tailless swept wing jet and the more conventional, tailed P 211. Only the P 211 was progressed further.

Variants

BV P 211.01 
Submitted alongside the tailless P 210 design, the P 211.01 also had a low swept wing but with a conventional tail. The single BMW 003A-1 engine was located amidships in the lower fuselage, with a tail boom extending above and behind it. Although it had good aerodynamic properties and was praised by officials, it did not go into production.

BV P 211.02 
The P 211.02 was similar to the P 211.01 but, since low cost and ease of manufacture were important, had a simpler straight, unswept wing. The wing was placed in the shoulder position, slightly below the top of the fuselage. The P 211.02 was designed by Richard Vogt and included wood in its construction. Parts of the plane were built, such as the steel air-intake/fuselage load-bearing structure for the single BMW 003A-1 engine. However, the P 211.02 didn't go past the project stage for the project was finally awarded to Heinkel whose He 162 Spatz went into mass-production.

See also
List of German aircraft projects, 1939–45

References

External links

P 211
Abandoned military aircraft projects of Germany
World War II jet aircraft of Germany